O' Holy Night is the 30th studio album released by Irish singer Daniel O'Donnell in 2010. It contains newly recorded versions of well-known Christmas songs.

Track listing
 "Mary's Boy Child" (3:46)
 "Angels We Have Heard on High" (3:04)
 "O Little Town of Bethlehem" (3:02)
 "The Little Drummer Boy" (3:12)
 "Adeste Fideles (O Come, All Ye Faithful)" (3:12)
 "Mary, Did You Know?" (3:25)
 "Away in a Manger" (2:20)
 "The Twelve Days of Christmas" (4:59)
 "O Holy Night" (4:36)
 "Remember Me" (3:16)
 "Silent Night" (3:16)
 "Once in Royal David's City" (2:13)
 "The First Noel" (2:14)
 "In the Bleak Midwinter" (4:35)
 "Christmas 1915" (4:25)

Charts

References

External links
 Daniel O'Donnell's website

Daniel O'Donnell albums
2010 Christmas albums
Christmas albums by Irish artists